Laugh Now, Cry Later is the seventh studio album by rapper Ice Cube, released on June 6, 2006. It is Ice Cube's first album to be released on his independently owned record label Lench Mob Records, Virgin Records, and EMI. This album is his first studio album in six years since his previous album, War & Peace Vol. 2 (The Peace Disc). After spending the previous six years mainly doing movie projects, it could be considered a comeback album.

The album received generally positive reviews from critics and debuted at number four on the US Billboard 200 selling 144,000 copies in first week. The album was certified gold by the Recording Industry Association of America (RIAA) in August 2006.

Background
Unlike Cube's previous album, Laugh Now, Cry Later features only a handful of collaborations. These include songs with West Coast rappers Snoop Dogg and WC, and Southern rapper Lil Jon. Laugh Now, Cry Later was preceded by the street single and accompanying video "Chrome & Paint". The first official single was the Scott Storch produced "Why We Thugs". The follow-up single, released in late June 2006, is the song "Go to Church", featuring Snoop Dogg and Lil Jon. The third single released from the album was the promo-only Steal the Show.

In the song "Growin' Up" he talks about and honours his deceased friend and co-rapper Eazy-E who along with Ice Cube were members of rap group N.W.A. "Never thought I'd see Eazy in a casket, thanks for everything, that's on everything. I learnt a lot of game from you, I like your son, he's got his name from you".

In an interview taken during its release, Ice Cube said: "I want to make a record that was like a history book. I wanted to make a record that does what all good hip-hop does: it makes you feel good; it kind of pumps you up, but it also shows you a part of life that you might not have been paying attention to or might not even know exists".

Release
The album was released independently on his Lench Mob Records on June 6, 2006. Five months later, Ice Cube re-released the album on October 31, 2006, under the name Laugh Now, Cry Later: O.G. Limited Edition. The DualDisc contains concert and backstage footage as well as a playable music video for each song. The artwork for this album contains a picture of Ice Cube holding a custom gold Colt Anaconda. A clean version of the album was also made. It replaces most of the profanities by repeating or using a sound effect.

Commercial performance
Laugh Now, Cry Later debuted at number four on the US Billboard 200, selling 144,000 copies in its first week. This became Ice Cube's sixth US top-ten album. In its second week, the album dropped to number ten on the chart, selling an additional 64,000 copies. On August 25, 2006, the album was certified gold by the Recording Industry Association of America (RIAA) for sales of over 500,000 copies. As of August 2008, the album sold 547,000 copies in the United States.

Track listing

Samples
"Chrome & Paint" – contains a sample of "The Continental Walk" by Hank Ballard
"Click Clack Get Back" – contains a sample of "Captain Bobby Stout" by The Jerry Hahn Brotherhood
"Spittin Pollaseeds" – contains a sample of "Baby" by Brandy
"A History of Violence" – contains a sample of "Memory Lane" by Minnie Riperton and a sample of "In the House - In a Heartbeat" by John Murphy
"Child Support" – contains a sample of "Kick in the Door" by The Notorious B.I.G.
"Growin' Up" – contains a sample of "Memory Lane" by Minnie Riperton
"Laugh Now, Cry Later" – contains a sample of "Master Plan" by Alan Tew
"Stop Snitchin'" – contains a sample of "Gangsta Gangsta" by N.W.A

Charts

Weekly charts

Year-end charts

Certifications

References

External links
Chart Overview on LNCL
Latest news on the album from Google News

Promotional album sampler featuring 10 songs

About the New Album, including snippets of an Ice Cube interview
Ice Cube Lyrics, Music, Biography Information and more

2006 albums
Ice Cube albums
Albums produced by Bud'da
Albums produced by Laylaw
Albums produced by Lil Jon
Albums produced by Warren G
Albums produced by Sean Combs
Albums produced by Swizz Beatz
Albums produced by Scott Storch
Albums produced by Emile Haynie
Albums produced by DJ Green Lantern